Bryan Namoff (born May 28, 1979 in Carson City, Nevada) is an American former soccer player who last played for D.C. United in Major League Soccer.

Career

College and amateur
Namoff grew up in Rockford, Illinois, where he emerged as a soccer standout at Boylan High School. He played college soccer at Bradley University from 1997 to 2000, where he was a first-team All-Missouri Valley Conference selection in 1999 and 2000, and scored a total of 32 goals and 17 assists while with the team. In 2000, he played for the Rockford Raptors in the USL Premier Development League.

Professional

Following his graduation, Namoff was selected 15th overall by D.C. United's then-coach Thomas Rongen in the 2001 MLS SuperDraft. Namoff made a significant impact as a rookie, registering seven assists in only 15 games while playing in the midfield. However, a change of coaches in the offseason brought Ray Hudson to the team, and Namoff's time was significantly curtailed. He appeared in only 11 games in 2002, and spent much of the season on loan with the Richmond Kickers in the USL First Division.

In 2003, Namoff began seeing more playing time for United at right back, appearing in 22 games and registering one assist. In 2004, Namoff locked down the right back position, starting 27 games for the team, scoring two assists. Namoff has continued to be first choice on the right side of United's back line ever since. As of the 2006 season, he has also been playing as a midfielder.

In July 2010, Namoff announced he was suspending his playing career after failing to recover from serious concussion.

International
Along with teammates Bobby Boswell, Brian Carroll, and Joshua Gros, Namoff made his first (and, to date, only) international appearance for the United States men's national soccer team on January 20, 2007, against Denmark.

Honors

D.C. United
 Major League Soccer MLS Cup (1): 2004
 Major League Soccer Supporter's Shield (2): 2006, 2007
 Lamar Hunt U.S. Open Cup (1): 2008

References

External links

 MLS player profile

1979 births
Living people
Bradley Braves men's soccer players
D.C. United players
People from Carson City, Nevada
United States men's international soccer players
Major League Soccer players
A-League (1995–2004) players
USL League Two players
Richmond Kickers players
Rockford Raptors players
Soccer players from Nevada
D.C. United draft picks
Association football defenders
American soccer players